Michael Curtis is a role-playing game designer and writer.

Career
Curtis' best-selling game book “The Dungeon Alphabet” won the Three Castles Award in 2011, as well as entering a third printing with an expanded edition. Also known for his self-published mega-dungeon setting Stonehell Dungeon: Down Night-Haunted Halls (2009) and Stonehell Dungeon: Into the Heart of Hell (2014), Curtis's adventure writing style is greatly influenced by both the Old School Renaissance movement and his admitted love of the so-called “Appendix N” authors listed by Gary Gygax on page 224 of the 1st edition Advanced Dungeons & Dragons Dungeon Masters Guide - particularly the works of H. P. Lovecraft and Robert E. Howard.

Work 
Writing credits include:
 Stonehell Dungeon: Down Night-Haunted Halls (2009), Author
 The Dungeon Alphabet (Goodman Games) (2011), Author
 Dungeon Crawl Classics Roleplaying Game (Goodman Games) (2012), Contributor
 Realms of Crawling Chaos (Goblinoid Games), Contributor
 Majus (Goblinoid Games) (2013), Author
 Dungeon Crawl Classics #73 Emirikol Was Framed! (Goodman Games) (2013), Author
 Dungeon Crawl Classics #75 The Sea Queen Escapes! (Goodman Games) (2013), Author
 Dungeon Crawl Classics #77 The Croaking Fane (Goodman Games) (2013), Author
 Dungeon Crawl Classics #79 Frozen in Time (Goodman Games) (2013), Author
 Dungeon Crawl Classics #80 Intrigue at the Court of Chaos (Goodman Games) (2013)
 Stonehell Dungeon: Into the Heart of Hell (2014)
 Dungeon Crawl Classics #97 The Queen of Elfland's Son (Goodman Games) (2018)

Awards 
The Dungeon Alphabet - Three Castles Award 2011, North Texas RPG Con

References

External links
http://poleandrope.blogspot.ca/

Living people
Role-playing game designers
Year of birth missing (living people)